By-elections to the 31st Canadian Parliament were held to fill vacancies in the House of Commons of Canada between the 1979 federal election and the 1980 federal election. The Progressive Conservative Party of Canada led a minority government for the entirety of the 31st Canadian Parliament.

Two seats became vacant during the 67-day Parliament, both were filled through by-elections.

See also
List of federal by-elections in Canada

Sources
 Parliament of Canada–Elected in By-Elections 

1979 elections in Canada
31st